A gubernatorial election was held on 11 July 2014 to elect the next governor of , a prefecture of Japan located in the Kansai region of Honshu island.

Candidates 
Source:

Yukiko Kada, incumbent since 2002, 64, former Kyoto Seika University Professor is not seeking an re election. She backed Taizo Mikazuki.
Taizo Mikazuki, 43, an ex-lawmaker of the DPJ, also endorsed by the SDP.
Takashi Koyari, 47, a former Ministry of Economy, Trade and Industry official. He was supported by the LDP, Komeito and Ishin no Kai.
Ikuo Tsubota, 55, junior high school teacher, endorsed by JCP.

Results

References 

2014 elections in Japan
Shiga gubernational elections
Politics of Shiga Prefecture
July 2014 events in Japan